The  is a national university in Kyoto, Japan. The school's predecessor was founded in 1876, and it was chartered as a university in 1949.

History
The Kyoto University of Education was established in 1949 from the merger of Kyōto shihan gakkō and Kyōto seinen shihan gakkō.

Athletics
The university is a member of the Kansai Collegiate American Football League, where its team Grampus competes.

Controversy
In 2009, 6 students of the Kyoto University of Education were arrested for gang-raping a 19-year-old woman in a Kyoto bar. All 6 students were members of sports teams at the university, including the American football team. The university suspended the six students indefinitely at the end of March 2009.

Notable alumni
 Tetsunosuke Kushida, music composer

External links
 Official website

References

Educational institutions established in 1876
Japanese national universities
Universities and colleges in Kyoto Prefecture
1876 establishments in Japan
Kansai Collegiate American Football League
Teachers colleges in Japan